Pool A of the 2023 Rugby World Cup will begin on 9 September 2023. The pool includes 2003 champions and 2019 runner-ups England, previous hosts Japan and Argentina. They are joined by Samoa, the winner of the Oceania 1 qualifier, and Chile (Americas 2).

Teams

Notes

Standings

Matches

England vs Argentina

Japan vs Chile

Notes:
This is the first ever meeting between these two sides at a World Cup.

Samoa vs Chile

Notes:
This is the first ever meeting between these two sides at a World Cup.

England vs Japan

Argentina vs Samoa

England vs Chile

Notes:
This is the first ever meeting between these two sides at a World Cup.

Japan vs Samoa

Argentina vs Chile

Notes:
This is the first ever meeting between these two sides at a World Cup.

England vs Samoa

Japan vs Argentina

References

Pool B
2023 in Argentine rugby union
2023–24 in English rugby union
2023 in Samoan rugby union